The 1947–48 season was the 68th season of competitive football in England.

Arsenal won the league title this season for the sixth time in their history, having been league champions five times during the 1930s.

Manchester United won the FA Cup, defeating Blackpool 4-2 in the final.

Honours

Football League

First Division
Arsenal won the title in their first season under new manager Tom Whittaker. Manchester United finished as runners-up for the second season in a row, though won their first silverware under Matt Busby by emerging victorious in the FA Cup. Burnley finished third, impressing in their first top-flight season in 18 years.

Grimsby Town and Blackburn Rovers were relegated to Division Two.

Second Division

Third Division North

Third Division South

Top goalscorers

First Division
Ronnie Rooke (Arsenal) – 33 goals

Second Division
Eddie Quigley (Sheffield Wednesday) – 23 goals

Third Division North
Jimmy Hutchinson (Lincoln City) – 32 goals

Third Division South
Len Townsend (Bristol City) – 31 goals

References